Newtown is a suburb in the town of Poole in Dorset, England with a population of 11,132, increasing to 12,515 at the 2011 census.

Local Governance 
Newtown is apart of the new Newtown and Heathlands ward within Bournemouth, Christchurch and Poole Council. It is currently represented by Cllr. Millie Earl, Cllr. Mark Robson and, Cllr. Marion Le Poidevin of the Liberal Democrats, as of the 2019 local elections.

National politics 
Newtown is part of the Poole parliamentary constituency.

References



Areas of Poole